Cone Mountain is a summit in the Canadian Rockies of Alberta, Canada. It is the southernmost peak in the Sundance Range.

Cone Mountain was so named in 1915 on account of its shape. The mountain's name became official in 1924 by the Geographical Names Board of Canada.


Climate
Based on the Köppen climate classification, Cone Mountain is located in a subarctic climate zone with cold, snowy winters, and mild summers. Temperatures can drop below  with wind chill factors below . Precipitation runoff from Cone Mountain drains into the Bow River which is a tributary of the Saskatchewan River.

Geology
The mountain is composed of sedimentary rock laid down during the Precambrian to Jurassic periods. Formed in shallow seas, this sedimentary rock was pushed east and over the top of younger rock during the Laramide orogeny.

See also
Geography of Alberta

References

Two-thousanders of Alberta
Canadian Rockies